Darren McLaine (born 11 October 1961) is a former Australian rules footballer who played with Collingwood in the Victorian Football League (VFL).

McLaine was a premiership player with Eltham in 1982.

McLaine was a Premiership Player with Frankston Bombers FC in 1991.

He played two senior games for Collingwood in the 1984 VFL season, their round two win over St Kilda at Victoria Park and a loss to Essendon at Windy Hill in round three.

References

1961 births
Australian rules footballers from Victoria (Australia)
Collingwood Football Club players
Eltham Football Club players
Living people